Oran McNulty (born 16 January 2000) is an English-born Irish rugby union player, currently playing for Pro14 and European Rugby Champions Cup side Connacht. He plays on the wing.

Connacht
McNulty was named in the Connacht Academy ahead of the 2020–21 season. It is his third year in the academy. He made his Connacht debut in Round 15 of the 2020–21 Pro14 against .

References

External links
itsrugby.co.uk Profile
Irish Rugby Profile

2000 births
Living people
Irish rugby union players
Connacht Rugby players
Rugby union wings